Hume is a small lunar impact crater that lies along the eastern limb of the Moon, along the southeast edge of Mare Smythii. It is located just on the far side of the Moon, but it is often brought into sight from Earth due to libration. Hume lies just to the west-northwest of the much larger Hirayama, and to the northeast of the flooded crater Swasey.

Hume has been flooded by flows of basaltic lava, leaving only a slender rim projecting above the surface. Its interior floor is level and has the same low albedo as the lunar mare to the northwest. The rim has a wide gap at the northern end, and the floor lies open to the exterior. This feature is not marked by any overlying impacts of note.

Satellite craters
By convention these features are identified on lunar maps by placing the letter on the side of the crater midpoint that is closest to Hume.

References

External links
 LTO-82A4 Hirayama — L&PI topographic map

Impact craters on the Moon